Lophocampa argentata, the silver-spotted tiger moth, is a species of moth in the family Erebidae. It was described by Packard in 1864. It is found from British Columbia to southern California, and east to Arizona, Nevada, New Mexico, Colorado, Utah, Wyoming and possibly to northern Mexico.

Larvae of this moth utilize numerous host plants in western North America, notably including the Douglas-fir.

Subspecies
Lophocampa argentata argentata
Lophocampa argentata subalpina (French, 1890) (Rocky Mountains, Colorado)

References

 C. Michael Hogan. 2008. Douglas-fir: Pseudotsuga menziesii, globalTwitcher.com, ed. Nicklas Strõmberg)
  Retrieved April 21, 2018.
 David L. Wood, Thomas Koerber, Robert F. Scharpf and Andrew J. Storer. 2003. Pests of the Native California Conifers, University of California Press,  233 pages
Lophocampa argentata at BOLD Systems
Lophocampa argentata at Encyclopedia of Life

argentata
Moths of North America
Taxa named by Alpheus Spring Packard
Moths described in 1864